41: A Portrait of My Father is a 2014 book written by George W. Bush for his father George H. W. Bush. The book was released on November 11, 2014. The book was reviewed in The New York Times, the Financial Times, The Wall Street Journal, The Times, The Washington Post, among others.

References

External links
Discussion with George W. Bush on 41: A Portrait of My Father, November 11, 2014, C-SPAN

2014 non-fiction books
Books about George H. W. Bush
Books by George W. Bush
American biographies
English-language books
Crown Publishing Group books
Books written by presidents of the United States